Hapoel Ra'anana Association Football Club (Amutat Hapoel Ra'anana Mahleket Kaduregel) is an Israeli football club based in the city of Ra'anana. They currently play in Liga Alef North, the third division of the Israeli Football League.

History
A Hapoel Ra'anana was established in 1938. They were placed in the South Division of Liga Bet (then the second division) in 1951–52.

The modern club was established in 1972, and in the mid-1990s was playing in Liga Gimel, the lowest tier of Israeli football. In 1995 they started a remarkable period of success after they won their division of Liga Gimel and were promoted to Liga Bet. In 1997–98, they won Liga Bet South A division and were promoted to Liga Alef. In 1998–99 they won the North Division of Liga Alef to earn promotion to Liga Artzit. After finishing third in 1999–2000, they won the league the following season and were promoted to Liga Leumit.

In 2008–09, the club was promoted to the Israeli Premier League for the first time in their history. However, they had to play its home matches at Hapoel Kfar Saba's Levita Stadium, as its home ground, the Karnei Oren Memorial Field, did not meet Premier League requirements. In January 2010, the city council published plans for a 7,500-capacity new stadium in Lev HaPark neighborhood.

After a single season in the top division, in which the club finished at the second bottom place, Ra'anana were relegated to Liga Leumit.

After three seasons in Liga Leumit, in 2012–13, Ra'anana finished runners-up and were promoted again to the Israeli Premier League. In the 2015–16 season, the club achieved its best placing to date, when they finished sixth in the Israeli Premier League.

In the 2019–20 season, Hapoel Ra'anana were relegated after suffering a 1-0 defeat to Ironi Kiryat Shmona, after 7 seasons in the top flight.

Players

Current squad

Club officials

Boardroom
Owner: Municipality of Ra'anana
President: Asher Alon, Damian Rotman
Chairman: Ilan Katz

Management
Manager (interim): Gal Cohen
Assistant Manager: Dani Bondar

Academy Coaching Staff
Youth Academy Director: Ami Vazana
Under 23 Coach: Ronny Keidar

Managers
 Eli Cohen (2006 – Feb 28, 2010)
 Tzvika Tzemah (April 1, 2010 – July 19, 2010)
 Eyal Lachman (May 1, 2010 – Oct 18, 2011)
 Meni Koretski (July 1, 2013– May 10, 2014)
 Haim Silvas (May 10, 2014– May 2017)
 Dudu Avraham (May 2017- September 2017)
 Guy Levy (September 2017- October 2017)
 Meni Koretski (October 2017-December 2019)
 Nisso Avitan (December 2019-February 2020)
 Eyal Lachman (February 2020-July 2020)
 Gal Cohen (July 2020-)

References
About Hapoel Ra'anana

External links
Club website  
Hapoel Ra'anana  Israel Football Association

 
Ra'anana
Ra'anana
Sport in Ra'anana
Association football clubs established in 1938
Association football clubs established in 1972
1938 establishments in Mandatory Palestine
1972 establishments in Israel